The 1982–83 AHL season was the 47th season of the American Hockey League. Thirteen teams played 80 games each in the schedule. The Rochester Americans finished first overall in the regular season, and won their fourth Calder Cup championship.

Team changes
 The New Brunswick Hawks become the St. Catharines Saints based in St. Catharines, Ontario, playing in the South Division.
 The Sherbrooke Jets join the AHL as an expansion team, based in Sherbrooke, Quebec, playing in the North Division.
 The Moncton Alpines join the AHL as an expansion team, 
 The Erie Blades merge with the Baltimore Skipjacks of Atlantic Coast Hockey League and play in the South Division of the AHL, based in Baltimore, Maryland.
 The Springfield Indians switch divisions from North to South.
 The Adirondack Red Wings switch divisions from South to North.

Final standings
Note: GP = Games played; W = Wins; L = Losses; T = Ties; GF = Goals for; GA = Goals against; Pts = Points;

Scoring leaders

Note: GP = Games played; G = Goals; A = Assists; Pts = Points; PIM = Penalty minutes

 complete list

Calder Cup playoffs

Trophy and award winners
Team awards

Individual awards

Other awards

See also
List of AHL seasons

References
AHL official site
AHL Hall of Fame
HockeyDB

 
American Hockey League seasons
2
2